Minchinabad, is a city of Bahawalnagar District in the Punjab province of Pakistan. The city is the capital of Minchinabad Tehsil. It underwent rapid development in the late 1860s and 1870s. The city is named after Colonel Charles Minchin, the British Political Agent overseeing the Bahawalpur Princely State from 1866-1876

References

Populated places in Bahawalnagar District